Samnangjin (also spelled Samrangjin) or Samnangjin-eup, is an eup, or town, in Miryang City, Gyeongsangnam-do, South Korea.  It is composed of thirteen ri.  Samnangjin lies in the southeastern corner of Miryang, bordering Wondong-myeon in Yangsan City.  

The Gyeongbu Line railroad passes through Samnangjin, and Mugunghwa-ho class passenger trains frequently stop there.  The northern tip of the Gyeongjeon Line also lies with Samnangjin, but there are no stations along that portion of the line.

The landscape of Samnangjin is shaped by the Nakdong River and its tributary the Miryang River.  Much of the land in Samnangjin lies along the eastern valleys of these two rivers, which also form the western border of the eup.  Notable mountains on the borders of Samnangjin include Cheontaesan to the south and Maneosan to the north.

Much of the agriculture in Samnangjin is focused on livestock, particularly beef cattle.

The Miryang campus of Pusan National University is located in Samnangjin's Cheonghak-ri.

References 

Miryang
Towns and townships in South Gyeongsang Province